("Chemical Theatre") is a compendium of early alchemical writings published in six volumes over the course of six decades. The first three volumes were published in 1602, while the final sixth volume was published in its entirety in 1661.  remains the most comprehensive collective work on the subject of alchemy ever published in the Western world.

All volumes of the work, with exception of the last two volumes, were published by Lazarus Zetzner in Oberursel and Strasbourg, France. The final two volumes were published posthumously by Zetzner's heirs, who continued to use his name for publication purposes.

The volumes are in actuality a collection of previously published and unpublished alchemical treatises, essays, poems, notes, and writings from various sources, some of which are attributed to known writers and others remain anonymous. Despite Zetzner acting primarily as publisher and editor, many of the contents are not believed to have been written by him.

History

 developed as an evolution of previous alchemical printing projects dating back as early as 1475, when a handful of writings believed to have been written by Geber (or pseudo-Geber) were printed with attached alchemical poems and circulated in the area of Venice, and then a decade later in Rome.

Petreius had been collecting alchemical documents with the intention of publishing a more complete compilation, though he never completed this task. Upon Petreius's death his collection came into the possession of his relative, Heinrich Petri of Basel who published it in cooperation with Pietro Perna and Guglielmo Gratarolo in 1561. By this time the collection had accrued a total of 53 texts and was published under the name, Verae alchemiae artisque metallicae, citra aenigmata, doctrina. Though Petri would continue to publish alchemical works, it was his partner Perna who in 1572 published an entire series of expanded publications totaling seven volumes with over 80 texts. Perna intended to include the collection of his son-in-law, Konrad Waldkirch, in an even larger multi-volume series, but instead sold the collection to Lazarus Zetzner.

Publication

The material is diverse, being intended as a single body of work containing all significant alchemical texts of its time. The physician and philosopher Sir Thomas Browne possessed a copy, while Isaac Newton filled the margins of his copy with annotations.

Within the various volumes are found some of the most studied works in the field of alchemy, such as Turba Philosophorum, Arcanum Philosophorum, Cabala Chemica, De Ovo Philosophorum, many tracts focused upon Secretum Secretorum, The Philosopher's Stone, the Elixir of Life, the Tabula Smaragdina, and several works attributed to Albertus Magnus and Thomas Aquinas.  The original publication dates of the specific writings found in the  range from just a few years prior to each volume's publication, to as far back as several centuries in some cases.

Contents

Because of the unstandardized nature of early publication practices and the reprinting of tracts from earlier editions, sometimes under their modified full "elenchus" titles, those studying the contents of  often encounter discrepancies in format, tract title, page number, and in some cases even authorship. For example, it is not clear whether some tracts that appear anonymous are in fact uniquely authored, or intended to be attributed to the author of the preceding text.

Some of the authorship proposed by Zetzner remains unverifiable due to the nature of publication, the various age of the works, and the practice of attributing authorship without modern methods of citation.  Considering the esoteric nature of the subject matter, this was not uncommon at the time of 's publication, but it does seem clear that Zetzner established the authorship of the various tracts according to his original source material.

Below is a list of the tracts found within , and their authors as established by Zetzner.

Volumes I-III

Volume I was published in Oberursel, while the subsequent volumes were published in Strasbourg. The first three volumes increased the number of tracts in each volume to the total of 88 in all.

Vol. I

 Lazarus Zetznerus,  (Introduction)
  (Table of Contents)
 Robertus Vallensis, 

  Arnaldi a Villa Nova 
 

 Johannes Chrysippus Fanianus, 
 Johannes Chrysippus Fanianus, 
 Thomas Mufett, 
 
 
 

 Thomas Mufett, 
 Theobaldus de Hoghelande Mittelburgensis, 

 
 

 Gerard Dorn, 

 
 

 Gerardus Dorn, 

 
 

 Gerardus Dorn, 

 
 

 Gerardus Dorn,  Hermetis Trismegisti, (Tabula Smaragdina); 

 
 
 
 
 
 
 

 Gerardus Dorn, 

 
 

 Gerardus Dorn, 

 
 

 Gerardus Dorn, 
 Bernardus G. Penotus, 

 
 

 Bernardus Trevisanus, 
 Dionysius Zacharias, 
 
 

  Nicolai Flamelli 

  Nicolao Flamello 
 
 
 

  (Index)

Vol. II

  (Table of Contents)
 Bernard Gilles Penot, 
 Gaston Claveus, 
 Aegidius de Vadis, 

 Bernard Gilles Penot, 
 
 
  Georgii Ripley 

 George Ripley, 
 
 
  Alberti Magni, 

 Johann Isaac Hollandus, 
 Bernard Gilles Penot, 
 Bernard Gilles Penot,  
 Bernard Gilles Penot, 
 Chrysorrhoas, 
 Josephus Quercetanus, 

 
 John Dee, 

 
 
 

 Lorenzo Ventura, 
 Giovanni Francesco Pico della Mirandola, 
 Roger Bacon,  Speculum alchemiae
 Richardus Anglicus, 
 
 Albertus Magnus, 

 

 Giovanni Agostino Panteo, 
 Giovanni Agostino Panteo, 
 
 
 
 
 

  (Index)

Vol. III

  (Table of Contents)
 
  
 Aristoteles, 
 Arnaldus de Villanova, 

 Arnaldus de Villanova, 
 Arnaldus de Villanova, 

 Efferarius Monachus, 
 Efferarius Monachus, 
 Raymundus Lullus, 
 Odomar, 
  
 
 

 
 

 
 

 

 Johannes de Rupescissa, 
 Giovanni Aurelio Augurello, Chrysopoeia 
 Giovanni Aurelio Augurello, 
 Thomas Aquinas, 

 
 Thomas Aquinas,  

 Joannes de Rupescissa, 
 Raymundus Lullus, 
 Joannes Isaac Hollandus, 
 Ewaldus Vogelius, 
 
  
 
 
 
 
 
 

  

 
 

 Jodocus Greverus (Grewer),  
 Alanus,  

 
 

  

 Joannes Pontanus, 
 

 Nicolas Barnaud, 
 Nicolas Barnaud, 

 
 

  

 Lambspringk,  
 
 
 
 Nicolas Barnaud, 

  

 
 
  George Ripley, 
 
 
  George Ripley, 
 
 
 Nicolas Barnaud, 

  

 
 

  

 
 

 
  (Index)

Volume IV

At the time of publication a reprinting of Volumes I-III was also issued. The reprinted editions are almost identical, though there are differences in details, such as page number, formatting, and minor rewording not affecting content. This often leads to differences in citations that use  as a reference source. The single significant difference in the new editions is the inclusion of a tract in Volume 3 entitled "" which is missing from the earlier editions. With the additional tracts found in Volume IV, the total tracts grew to 143.

 Lazarus Zetzner,  (1613) (Introduction)
  (Table of Contents)
 Raymundus Lullus, 
 Raymundus Lullus, 
 Raymundus Lullus, 

 
 

 Artefius, 

 
 

 Heliophilus a Percis Philochemicus, 

 
 

 Hieronymus de Zanetinis, 
 Thomas Arfoncinus, 
 Anonymus,  

 
 
 
 
 Plutarchus, 

 Nicolaus Niger Happelius, 
 
  (dated 4 July 1612)
 
 

 Venceslaus Lavinus Moravus, 
 Nicolaus Niger Hapelius, 
 
 

 Fabianus de Monte S. Severini, 
 Nicolaus Niger Happelius, 
 Andreas Brentzius, 
 , (Dated 20 January 1606)
  Alberti Magni 
 Processus Raimundi Lulli, 
 
  Gebri Arabis, 
  Gebri 
 
  Gebro 
  B. Thomae de Aquino,  Paracelsus
 Paracelsi 
  Paracelsi 
 
 
 
 
 
 
 

 
 Bernardus Gilles Penotus, 
 I. L., 
 I. B. A., 
 Guilielmus Dubroc, 
 Stephanus Gasconius, 
 Gaston Dulco, 
 Bernardus Gilles Penotus, 
 Gaston Dulco, 
 
 Gaston Dulco, 
 Anonymus, 
 
 

 Divi Leschi Genus Amo, 
 
 Johan Henricus Alstedius, 
 
 
 
 
 
 
 
 
 
 
 
 
 
 Divi Leschi Genus Amo, 
 Divi Leschi Genus Amo, 
 Divi Leschi Genus Amo, 
 
 M. Georgio Beato , 
 
 
 
 Arnoldus de Villanova, 
 Hieronymus Megiserus, 
  Arnaldi de Vila Nova
 Arnoldus de Villanova, 
 Arnoldus de Villanova, 
 Arnoldus de Villanova, 
 
 
 
 
 Joannes de Lasnioro, 
 Joannes Trithemius, 
 Hermes Trismegistus, 
 Dominicus Gnosicus Belga, 
 , dated 23 October 1608)
 Hermes Trismegistus,   
 
 
 
 
 
 
 
 
 David Lagneus, 
 
  (1611)
 
 
 
 
 
 Aenigmaticum quoddam epitaphium   (vide III, 744)
 
 M. Quadratus, 
 Albertus Magnus, 
 Albertus Magnus, 
 Albertus Magnus, 
 Avicenna, 
 Avicenna, 
 Avicenna, 
 Guilhelmus Tecenensis, 
 Joannes Dumbeler, 
 Anonymus,  
 Magister Valentinus, 
 Anonymus, 
 
 Thomas Aquinas, 
  S. Thomae de Aquino
 
 Anonymus, 
 Petrus de Silento, 
 
 Joachimus Tanckius,  (Dated 1 April 1603)
 Joachimus Tanckius, 
 Anonymus, 
 Joachimus Tanckius, 
 Paulus Eck de Sultzbach, 
  (Index)

Volume V

This is the first of the volumes to be published by Zetzner's heirs, most likely Eberhardi Zetzner, though the text still bears Lazarus Zetzner's name. This volume contains a substantial number of "older" tracts, including one of the oldest alchemical tracts in existence, . These additions would increase the number of tracts to 163.

 Heredes L. Zetzneri,  (Introduction)
  (Table of Contents)
 Turba philosophorum, 
  
 
 Micreris, 
 Plato, 
 Calid filus Iarichi, 
 
 
 Calid, 
 
 Senior Zadith filius Hamuelis, 
 Willem Mennens, 
 
 
 
 
 
 Petrus Bonus, 
 
 
 
 Michael Scotus, 
 Lucas Rodargirus, 
 
 
 Lucaa Rodargirius, 
 Alphonsus Rex Castellae, 
 
 
 
  Arnoldi Villanovani 
 Thomas Aquinas, 
 Cornelius Alvetanus Arnsrodius, 
   
 Roger Bacon,  
  Roseae Crucis fratribus
 
  Rogerii Baconis 
 John Dee, 
 Christophorus Horn, 
  (Index)

Volume VI

Volume VI was published by Eberhardi Zetzner, though compiled by Johannes Jacobus Heilman. This volume contains tracts originally issued in German or French, but were translated by Heilman into Latin. These additional tracts would increase the total tracts to over 200.

 Johannes Jacobus Heilman,  (Dedication)
 Johannes Jacobus Heilman,  Sendivogii ) 
 Johannes Jacobus Heilman,  (Introduction)
  (Table of Contents)
 Blasius Vigenerius, 
 
 Johannes Collesson, 
 
 
 
 
 Anonymus , 
 
 
 
 Christophorus Parisiensis, 
 
 
 
 
 
  Geberi
 
 
 
 
 Johannes Grasseus alias Chortalasseus, 
 
 
  (1598)
 
 Anonymus, 
 
 
 
  F. R. C. 
  F. R. C. 
 

 Andreas Orthelius,  Michaelis Sendivogii Poloni, XII.  (1624)
 
  Sendivogii
  Sendivogii
 Andreas de Blauwen, 
 
 
  secretum secretorum
 
 Orthelius, 
 Joannes Pontanus, 
 Orthelius, 
 Haimon, 
 Cornelius Alvetanus,  (14 July 1565)
 
 
 
 Michael Pezelius, 
 Sententia aut compositio litis spiritus et judicis Mercurii. Ex vetusto scripto Bellum seu Duellum equestre vocato, ad accusationem et responsionem Solis et Martis, per picturas repraesenta 
 
  "",  Johannis Grassei Chortalassei 
 
 
 
 
 
 
 

 Johannes Isaac Hollandus, 
 Johannes Chartier, 
 
 
 
 Joachim Polemann, 
 Solinus Saltzthal Regiomontanus,  (1654)
 
 
 
 
 Hermes Trismegistos, Tabula smaragdina 
 Henri de Rochas,  (1634)
 
 
 
 
 
 
  (Index)

Related publications
Though  remains the most comprehensive single body of work on alchemy, future publications would emulate Zetzner's attempt to gather alchemical works into a single reference source.  In 1652, Elias Ashmole published a similarly entitled work by the name of Theatrum Chemicum Britannicum in London. The two works are related by subject, but are different in content. However, because of the printing date of Ashmole's work and the similar titles, the two compendiums are often confused.

Another work, prepared by Friederich Roth-Scholtz, was entitled .

References

Notes

Resources
 H. C. Bolton, A select bibliography of chemistry, Washington 1893 (= Smithsonian Miscellaneous Collections, vol. XXXVI), p. 1051–1058
 J. Ferguson, Bibliotheca chemica, Glasgow 1906, vol. 2, p. 436-439
 A. L. Caillet, Manuel bibliographique des sciences psychiques ou occultes, Paris 1912, vol. 3, p. 591-595 (after N. Lenglet Dufresnoy, Histoire de la philosophie hermétique, Paris 1742, vol. 3, p. 49)
 T. Hofmeier, (collation of the three editions of Theatrum chemicum, the planned compilation by I. Habrecht and J. J. Manget's Bibliotheca chemica curiosa), appendix to: C. Gilly, "On the genesis of L. Zetzner's Theatrum Chemicum in Strasbourg" in: Magia, alchimia, scienza dal '400 al '700. L'influsso di Ermete Trismegisto, ed. C. Gilly, C. van Heertum, Firenze: Centro Di, 2003, p. 435-441, with a bibliography of original editions on p. 442-446

External links
 Theatrum Chemicum Electronicum, all volumes scanned from originals at the Library of Wielkopolska.
 Free downloadable volumes scanned from originals as Pdf-files at archive.org: Volume 1, 1659, Volume 5, 1622 (Latin)
 Free downloadable volumes scanned from originals as Pdf-files at e-rara.ch: Volumes 1 to 3, 1602, Volumes 1 to 4 and 6, 1659-1661, Volume 5, 1622 (Latin)
 Theatrum Chemicum, Vol VI at Google Books. (Latin)

Occult books
Alchemical documents